is the third compilation album by Japanese idol duo Wink, released by Polystar on December 21, 1992. It covers the duo's singles and B-sides from 1988 to 1993.

The album peaked at No. 23 on Oricon's albums chart and sold over 49,000 copies.

Track listing

Charts

References

External links 
 
 

1994 compilation albums
Wink (duo) compilation albums
Japanese-language compilation albums